Diana Meyers is a philosopher working in the philosophy of action and in the philosophy of feminism. Meyers is professor emerita of philosophy at the University of Connecticut.

Biography
Diana Meyers holds a bachelor's degree from the University of Chicago and a master's degree and PhD from The Graduate Center, CUNY. She mostly works "in three main areas of philosophy: philosophy of action, feminist ethics, and human rights theory".

Awards
In December 2012, Meyers was awarded the Distinguished Woman Philosopher award at the 2012 APA Eastern Conference.

Publications

Books
  Spanish translation, Alianza Editorial, Madrid, 1988; Chapter 5 reprinted in The Philosophy of Human Rights, ed. Morton E. Winston, Wadsworth, 1989.
 
  Part IV, Chapter 2 reprinted in Dignity, Character, and Self-Respect, ed. Robin S. Dillon, Routledge, 1994; Part II, Chapters 2-3, revised and translated into German to be reprinted in Autonomie, ed. Monika Betzler, Mentis. Preview.
 
  Oxford Scholarship On-Line, 2003; excerpt of Chapter 7 in the APA Newsletter on Feminism and Philosophy, Fall 2002; a Choice Outstanding Academic Title for 2004.
  (A Selection of New and Previously Published Essays with an Introduction by the Author).

Articles
"Human Rights in Pre-Affluent Societies", The Philosophical Quarterly, 31(1981), pp. 139–144.
"The Inevitability of the State", Analysis, 41 (1981), pp. 46–49.
"The Rationale for Inalienable Rights in Moral Systems", Social Theory and Practice, 7 (1981), pp. 127–143.
"Rights-based Rights", Law and Philosophy, 3 (1984), pp. 407–418.
"A Sketch of a Rights Taxonomy", in Economic Justice: Private Rights and Public Responsibilities, edited by Kenneth Kipnis and Diana T. Meyers (1985), pp. 87–94.
"The Politics of Self-respect:  A Feminist Perspective", Hypatia, 1 (1986): 83–100.
"Work and Self-respect", in Moral Rights in the Workplace, edited by Gertrude Ezorsky, State University of New York Press, 1986, pp. 18–27; reprinted in Ethical  Theory and Business, edited by Norman Bowie and Tom  L. Beauchamp, Prentice-Hall, 1988, in Making a Living, edited by Janet Marting, Harper Collins, 1993, in Findings, edited by Lewis A.  Meyers, D.C. Heath, 1995.
"Kant's Liberal Alliance: A Permanent Peace?" in Political Realism and International Morality:  Ethics in the Nuclear Age, edited by Kenneth Kipnis and Diana T. Meyers, Westview Press, 1987, pp. 212–219.
"The Socialized Individual and Individual Autonomy: An Intersection between Philosophy and Psychology", in Women and Moral Theory, edited by Eva Kittay and Diana T. Meyers, 1987, pp. 139–153.
"Personal Autonomy and the Paradox of Feminine Socialization", The Journal of Philosophy, Vol. 84 (1987), pp. 619–628, reprinted in Ethics in the 90s, ed. Joram Graf Haber, Bartlett, 1997.
"Democratic Theory and the Democratic Agent", NOMOS XXXII, ed. John W. Chapman and Alan Wertheimer. New York: NYU Press, 1990, pp. 126–150.
"Personal Autonomy or the Deconstructed Subject?" Hypatia, Vol.7 (1992), pp. 124–132.
"The Subversion of Women's Agency in Psychoanalytic Feminism: Chodorow, Flax, Kristeva" in 
"Social Exclusion, Moral Reflection, and Rights", Law and Philosophy, Vol. 12 (1993), pp. 115–130; reprinted in Radical Critiques of the Law, edited by Stephen Griffin and Robert Moffat, U.  Kansas Press, 1997.
"Moral Reflection:  Beyond Impartial Reason", Hypatia, Vol. 8 (1993), pp. 21–47.
"Cultural Diversity:  Rights, Goals, and Competing Values", in Jewish Identity, edited by Michael Krausz and David Goldberg, Temple University Press, 1993, pp. 15–34; reprinted in Rights and Reason: Essays in Honor of Carl Wellman, edited by Marilyn Friedman, Larry May, Kate Parsons, and Jennifer Stiff, Kluwer, 2000.
"Rights in Collision:  A Non-Punitive, Compensatory Remedy for Abusive Speech", Law and Philosophy, 14 (2),1995: 203-243; reprinted in Liberty, Equality, Plurality, edited by Larry May and Christine Sistare, University Press of Kansas, 1997; nominated for the Berger Prize for the best published paper in legal theory,  1996.
"Emotion and Heterodox Moral Perception: An Essay in Moral Social Psychology", in Feminists Rethink the Self, edited by Diana T. Meyers, Westview Press, 1997.
"Moral Subjectivity" in the Blackwell Dictionary of Business Ethics, edited by R. Edward Freeman and Patricia Werhane, 1997.
"The Family Romance: A Fin-de-Siecle Tragedy", in Feminism and Families, edited by Hilde Nelson, Routledge, 1997; reprinted in Feminist Social Thought: A Reader, edited by Diana T. Meyers, Routledge, 1997.
"Agency", in A Companion to Feminist Philosophy, edited by Alison Jaggar and Iris Young, Blackwell, 1998.
"Tropes of Social Relations and the Problem of Tropisms in Figurative Discourse", in Norms and Values: Essays in Honor of Virginia Held, edited by Mark Halfon and Joram Haber, Rowman and Littlefield, 1998.
"Authenticity for Real People", in Proceedings of the Twentieth World Congress of Philosophy: Philosophy of Mind and Philosophy of Psychology (2001):195-202.
"Miroir, Memoire, Mirage: Appearance, Aging, and Women", in Mother Time: Ethical Issues in Women and Aging. edited by Margaret Urban Walker, Rowman and Littlefield, 1999.
"Feminist Perspectives on the Self", in the Stanford Encyclopedia of Philosophy,  (Fall 1999 Edition), ed. Edward N. Zalta, URL: http://plato.stanford.edu/archives/fall1999/feminism-self. 1999.
"Intersectional Identity and the Authentic Self?  Opposites Attract", in Relational Autonomy, edited by Catriona Mackenzie and Natalie Stoljar, Oxford University Press, 2000.
"The Rush to Motherhood — Pronatalist Discourse and Women's Autonomy", Signs 26 (2001): 735-773; received Honorable Mention as a 2003 Outstanding Article, American Sociological Association, Sex and Gender Section.
"Marginalized Identities — Individuality, Groups, and Theory" in Marginal Groups and Mainstream American Culture, ed. Yolanda Estes, Arnold Lorenzo Farr, Patricia Smith, and Clelia Smyth, Kansas University Press, 2000.
"Feminism and Women's Autonomy: The Challenge of Female Genital Cutting", Metaphilosophy 31 (2000): 469-491; also in The Edinburgh Companion to Contemporary Liberalism, ed. Mark Evans, Edinburgh University Press, 2001.
"Nancy J. Chodorow" in Key Contemporary Social Theorists, Ed. Anthony Elliott and Larry Ray. Oxford: Blackwell, 2002.
"Social Groups and Individual Identities", in Feminists Doing Ethics, ed. Peggy DesAutels and Joanne Waugh, Rowman and Littlefield, 2001.
"Gendered Work and Autonomy", in Recognition, Responsibility, and Rights: Feminist Ethics and Social Theory. Ed. Hilde Nelson and Robin Fiore. Rowman and Littlefield, 2003.
"Frontiers of Individuality: Embodiment and Relationships in Cultural Context", History and Theory 42 (May 2003): 267-281.
"Narrative and Moral Life", in Setting the Moral Compass: Essays by Women Philosophers. ed. Cheshire Calhoun. Oxford University Press, 2004; short version published in Center for Research on Women Working Papers, Rutgers University, 2003 and translated into Croatian in Zarez, June 2003.
"Feminine Mortality Imagery: Feminist Ripostes", in Being Yourself: Essays on Identity, Action, and Social Life, Rowman and Littlefield, March 2004.
"The Three Freds and the Fate of Their Happiness", Journal of Social Philosophy 35 (Spring 2004): 8-10.
"Decentralizing Autonomy — Five Faces of Selfhood", in Autonomy and the Challenges to Liberalism. Ed. Joel Anderson and John Christman. Cambridge University Press, 2005.
"Introduction: Women Philosophers, Sidelined Challenges, and Professional Philosophy." Hypatia 30 (3) 2005: 149-152.
"Who's There? Selfhood, Self-regard, and Social Relations." Hypatia (special issue on Feminist Philosophy in the Analytic Tradition, Ed. Samantha Brennan and Anita Superson), 20 (4) 2005: 200-215.
"GEM Anscombe." Encyclopedia of Women in World History, Ed. Bonnie Smith, Oxford University Press, 2008.
"Narrative Structures, Narratives of Abuse, and Human Rights" in Feminist Ethics and Social and Political Philosophy: Theorizing the Non- Ideal. Ed. Lisa Tessman, Kluwer, 2009.
"Artifice and Authenticity:  Gender Technology and Agency in Two Jenny Saville Portraits."  In "You've Changed": Sex Reassignment and Personal Identity.  Ed. Laurie Shrage. Oxford University Press. 2009.
"Philosophical Feminism", Encyclopædia Britannica, 2009.
"Two Victim Paradigms and the Problem of 'Impure' Victims." Humanity: An International Journal of Human Rights, Humanitarianism, and Development, Vol. 2, No. 2, Fall 2011: 255-275.
"Jenny Saville Remakes the Female Nude – Feminist Reflections on the State of the Art" in Beauty Unlimited, Ed. Peg Brand, Indiana University Press, 2012.
"Psychocorporeal Selfhood, Practical Intelligence, and Adaptive Autonomy", in Autonomy and the Self, ed. Michael Kühler and Nadja Jelinek, in the Philosophical Studies series, ed. Stephen Hetheringten, Springer 2012.
"Feminism and Sex Trafficking: Rethinking Some Aspects of Autonomy and Paternalism",  Ethical Theory and Moral Practice for a special issue "Private Autonomy, Public Paternalism?" Ed. Annette Dufner and Michael Kühler, 2013; DOI: 10.1007/s10677-013-9452-1.
"Corporeal Selfhood, Self-Interpretation, and Narrative Selfhood." Philosophical Explorations.  12/5/2013: DOI: 10.1080/13869795.2013.856933.
"Victims, Agency, and Human Rights." e-IR. 2013:  http://www.e-ir.info/2013/12/09/victims-agency-and-human-rights/ (open access).
"The Feminist Debate over Values in Autonomy Theory." In  Autonomy, Oppression, and Gender. Ed. Mark Piper and Andrea Veltman. Forthcoming Oxford University Press, forthcoming summer 2014.
"Rethinking Coercion for a World of Poverty and Exploitation." In Poverty, Agency and Human Rights. Ed. Diana Tietjens Meyers. Oxford University Press, forthcoming 2014.
"The Feminist Debate over Values in Autonomy Theory." In  Autonomy, Oppression, and Gender. Ed. Mark Piper and Andrea Veltman.  Oxford University Press. forthcoming 2014.
"Rethinking Coercion for a World of Poverty and Transnational Migration." In Poverty, Agency and Human Rights. Ed. Diana Tietjens Meyers.  Oxford University Press.
"Victims of Trafficking, Reproductive Rights, and Asylum." In Oxford Handbook of Reproductive Ethics. Ed. Leslie P. Francis. Oxford University Press.

References

External links 
 Full list of publications

Living people
21st-century American philosophers
Action theorists
American women philosophers
American ethicists
Philosophers of language
Feminist philosophers
University of Chicago alumni
University of Connecticut faculty
Year of birth missing (living people)
21st-century American women